Chemical control may refer to:
 Any method to eradicate or limit the growth of pathogens which transmit disease to animals and plants, especially:
Herbicides
 Insecticides 
 Fungicides
 In molecular biology, the use of biochemicals to control physiological functions such as breathing and molecular events such as receptor signaling

See also 
 Regulation of chemicals

Science disambiguation pages